The Colwyn Bay Deanery is a Roman Catholic deanery in the Diocese of Wrexham that covers several churches in Conwy.

The dean is centred at Our Lady Star Of The Sea Church in Llandudno.

Churches 
 St Joseph, Colwyn Bay
 St Michael and All Angels, Conwy
 Our Lady Star of the Sea, Llandudno
 The Most Holy Family, Llandudno Junction
 St Mary of the Angels, Llanfairfechan - served from Llandudno Junction
 The Good Shepherd (Y Bugail Da), Llanrwst
 Sacred Heart, Old Colwyn

Gallery

References

External links
 Diocese of Wrexham site 
 St Joseph Parish site
 Our Lady Star of the Sea Parish site

Roman Catholic Deaneries in the Diocese of Wrexham
Colwyn Bay
Llandudno